MCorp, M-Corp, or M.Corp. may refer to:

 MCorp Bank, a Texas bank holding company, whose banks were acquired by Bank One Corporation
 "M-Corp", an episode of Red Dwarf
 M.Corp., an abbreviation for Municipal Corporation